Euodia lunuankenda is a species of plant in the family Rutaceae. It is native to tropical Asia.

References

lunuankenda
Flora of tropical Asia
Endangered plants
Taxonomy articles created by Polbot
Taxobox binomials not recognized by IUCN